From October 25, 2014 to April 4, 2015, the following skiing events took place at various locations around the world.

Alpine skiing

International Ski Federation
 October 25, 2014 – March 22, 2015: 2015 Alpine Skiing World Cup
 October 25 & 26, 2014: World Cup #1 in  Sölden
 Men's Giant Slalom winner:  Marcel Hirscher
 Women's Giant Slalom winner:  Anna Fenninger
 November 15 & 16, 2014: World Cup #2 in  Levi (Kittilä)
 Men's Slalom winner:  Henrik Kristoffersen
 Women's Slalom winner:  Tina Maze
 November 29 & 30, 2014: World Cup #3a in  Lake Louise, Alberta (Ski Resort)
 Men's Downhill winner:  Kjetil Jansrud
 Men's Super G winner:  Kjetil Jansrud
 November 29 & 30, 2014: World Cup #3b in  Aspen, Colorado
 Women's Slalom winner:  Nicole Hosp
 Women's Giant Slalom winner:  Eva-Maria Brem
 December 2 – 7, 2014: World Cup #4a in  Lake Louise
 Women's Downhill winner #1:  Tina Maze
 Women's Downhill winner #2:  Lindsey Vonn
 Women's Super G winner:  Lara Gut
 December 2 – 7, 2014: World Cup #4b in  Beaver Creek Resort (Avon, Colorado)
 Men's Downhill winner:  Kjetil Jansrud
 Men's Super G winner:  Hannes Reichelt
 Men's Giant Slalom winner:  Ted Ligety
 December 12 – 14, 2014: World Cup #5 in  Åre #1
 Men's Giant Slalom winner:  Marcel Hirscher
 Women's Giant Slalom winner:  Tina Maze
 Men's Slalom winner:  Marcel Hirscher
 Women's Slalom winner:  Maria Pietilä-Holmner
 December 17 – 20, 2014: World Cup #6a in  Val Gardena / Groeden
 Men's Downhill winner:  Steven Nyman
 Men's Super G winner:  Kjetil Jansrud
 December 19 – 21, 2014: World Cup #6b in  Val-d'Isère
 Women's Downhill winner:  Lindsey Vonn
 Women's Super G winner:  Elisabeth Görgl
 December 21, 2014: World Cup #7 in  Alta Badia
 Men's Giant Slalom winner:  Marcel Hirscher
 December 22, 2014: World Cup #8 in  Madonna di Campiglio
 Men's Slalom winner:  Felix Neureuther
 December 26 – 28, 2014: World Cup #9a in  Santa Caterina di Valfurva
 Men's Downhill winner:  Travis Ganong
 December 28 & 29, 2014: World Cup #9b in  Kühtai in Tirol
 Women's Giant Slalom winner:  Sara Hector
 Women's Slalom winner:  Mikaela Shiffrin
 January 4 – 6: World Cup #10 in  Zagreb-Sljeme 
 Men's Slalom winner:  Marcel Hirscher
 Women's Slalom winner:  Mikaela Shiffrin
 January 10 & 11: World Cup #11b in  Adelboden
 Men's Giant Slalom winner:  Marcel Hirscher
 Men's Slalom winner:  Stefano Gross
 January 13 – 18: World Cup #12a in  Wengen
 Men's Alpine skiing combined winner:  Carlo Janka
 Men's Slalom skiing winner:  Felix Neureuther
 Men's Downhill:  Hannes Reichelt
 January 13: World Cup #12b in  Flachau
 Women's Slalom winner:  Frida Hansdotter
 January 15 – 18: World Cup #12c in  Cortina d'Ampezzo
 Women's Downhill #1 winner:  Elena Fanchini
 Women's Downhill #2 winner:  Lindsey Vonn
 January 20 – 25: World Cup #13a in  Kitzbühel
 Men's Super G winner:  Dominik Paris
 Men's Alpine skiing combined winner:  Alexis Pinturault
 Men's Downhill winner:  Kjetil Jansrud
 Men's Slalom winner:  Mattias Hargin
 January 22 – 25: World Cup #13b in  St. Moritz
 Women's Downhill winner:  Lara Gut
 Women's Super G winner:  Lindsey Vonn
 January 27: World Cup #14 in  Schladming
 Men's Slalom winner:  Aleksandr Khoroshilov
 February 19 – 22: World Cup #15a in  Saalbach-Hinterglemm
 Men's Downhill winner:  Matthias Mayer
 Men's Super G winner:  Matthias Mayer
 February 21 & 22: World Cup #15b in  Maribor
 Women's Giant Slalom winner:  Anna Fenninger
 Women's Slalom winner:  Mikaela Shiffrin
 February 26 – March 1: World Cup #16a in  Garmisch-Partenkirchen #1
 Men's Downhill winner:  Hannes Reichelt
 Men's Giant Slalom winner:  Marcel Hirscher
 February 27 – March 2: World Cup #16b in  Bansko
 Women's Alpine Combined winner:  Anna Fenninger
 Women's Super G winner:  Anna Fenninger
 March 5 – 8: World Cup #17a in  Kvitfjell
 Men's Downhill winner:  Hannes Reichelt
 Men's Super G winner:  Kjetil Jansrud
 March 5 – 8: World CUp #17b in  Garmisch-Partenkirchen #2
 Women's Downhill winner:  Tina Weirather
 Women's Super G winner:  Lindsey Vonn
 March 13 & 14: World Cup #18a in  Åre #2
 Women's Giant Slalom winner:  Anna Fenninger
 Women's Slalom winner:  Mikaela Shiffrin
 March 14 & 15: World Cup #18b in  Kranjska Gora
 Men's Giant Slalom winner:  Alexis Pinturault
 Men's Slalom winner:  Henrik Kristoffersen 
 March 16 – 22: World Cup #19 (final) in  Méribel
 Men's Downhill winner:  Kjetil Jansrud
 Women's Downhill winner:  Lindsey Vonn
 Men's Super G winner:  Dustin Cook
 Women's Super G winner:  Lindsey Vonn
 Men's Slalom winner:  Marcel Hirscher
 Women's Slalom winner:  Mikaela Shiffrin
 Men's Giant Slalom winner:  Henrik Kristoffersen
 Women's Giant Slalom winner:  Anna Fenninger
 Mixed Team Event winners:  (Charlotte Chable, Michelle Gisin, Wendy Holdener, Gino Caviezel, Justin Murisier, Reto Schmidiger)
 February 2 – 15: 2015 FIS Alpine World Ski Championships in  Vail / Beaver Creek
 Men's Super G winner:  Hannes Reichelt
 Women's Super G winner:  Anna Fenninger
 Men's Downhill winner:  Patrick Küng
 Women's Downhill winner:  Tina Maze
 Men's Alpine Combined winner:  Marcel Hirscher
 Women's Alpine Combined winner:  Tina Maze
 Men's Giant Slalom winner:  Ted Ligety
 Women's Giant Slalom winner:  Anna Fenninger
 Mixed Team Event winners:  (Eva-Maria Brem, Nicole Hosp, Michaela Kirchgasser, Marcel Hirscher, Christoph Nösig, Philipp Schörghofer)
 Men's Slalom winner:  Jean-Baptiste Grange
 Women's Slalom winner:  Mikaela Shiffrin
 March 7 – 13: World Junior Alpine Skiing Championships 2015 in  Hafjell
 Men's Junior Giant Slalom winner:  Henrik Kristoffersen
 Women's Junior Giant Slalom winner:  Nina Ortlieb
 Men's Junior Slalom winner:  Henrik Kristoffersen
 Women's Junior Slalom winner:  Paula Moltzan
 Men's Junior Alpine Combined winner:  Loïc Meillard
 Women's Junior Super Combined winner:  Rahel Kopp
 Men's Junior Super G winner:  Miha Hrobat
 Women's Junior Super G winner:  Federica Sosio
 Men's Junior Downhill winner:  Henri Battilani
 Women's Junior Downhill winner:  Mina Fürst Holtmann
 Mixed Junior Team Event winners:

IPC Alpine Skiing World Cup
 January 8 – February 5: 2014–15 IPC Alpine Skiing World Cup
 January 8 – 11: World Cup #1 in  La Molina (Barcelona)
 For men's SL1 results, click here.
 For men's SL2 results, click here.
 For men's SL3 results, click here.
 For men's SL4 results, click here.
 For women's SL1 results, click here.
 For women's SL2 results, click here.
 For women's SL3 results, click here.
 For women's SL4 results, click here.
 January 26 – 30: World Cup #2 in  Tignes
 For men's and women's downhill results, click here.
 February 2 – 5: World Cup #3 (final) in  St. Moritz
 For men's and women's slalom and giant slalom results, click here.
 February 28 – March 10: 2015 IPC Alpine Skiing World Championships in  Panorama, British Columbia
  won both the gold and overall medal tallies.

Biathlon

IBU World Cup
 November 29, 2014 – March 22, 2015: 2014–15 Biathlon World Cup
 November 29, 2014 – December 7, 2014: World Cup #1 in  Östersund
 Men's 20 km winner:  Emil Hegle Svendsen
 Men's 10 km Sprint winner:  Martin Fourcade
 Men's 12.5 km Pursuit winner:  Martin Fourcade
 Women's 15 km winner:  Darya Domracheva
 Women's 7.5 km Sprint winner:  Tiril Eckhoff
 Women's 10 km Pursuit winner:  Kaisa Mäkäräinen
 Mixed 2 x 6 km + 2 x 7.5 km Relay winners:  (Anaïs Bescond, Anaïs Chevalier, Simon Fourcade, and Martin Fourcade)
 December 11 – 14, 2014: World Cup #2 in  Hochfilzen
 Men's 10 km Sprint winner:  Johannes Thingnes Bø
 Women's 7.5 km Sprint winner: Kaisa Mäkäräinen
 Men's 4 x 7.5 km Relay winners:  (Maxim Tsvetkov, Timofey Lapshin, Dmitry Malyshko, and Anton Shipulin)
 Women's 4 x 6 km Relay winners:  (Luise Kummer, Franziska Hildebrand, Vanessa Hinz, and Franziska Preuß)
 Men's 12.5 km Pursuit winner:  Martin Fourcade
 Women's 10 km Pursuit winner:  Kaisa Mäkäräinen
 December 17 – 21, 2014: World Cup #3 in  Pokljuka
 Men's 10 km Sprint winner:  Anton Shipulin
 Women's 7.5 km Sprint winner:  Gabriela Soukalová
 Men's 12.5 km Pursuit winner:  Emil Hegle Svendsen
 Women's 10 km Pursuit winner:  Darya Domracheva
 Men's 15 km Mass Start winner:  Anton Shipulin
 Women's 12.5 km Mass Start winner:  Kaisa Mäkäräinen
 January 6 – 11: World Cup #4 in  Oberhof
 Men's 10 km Sprint winner:  Martin Fourcade
 Women's 7.5 km Sprint winner:  Veronika Vítková
 Men's 15 km Mass Start winner:  Martin Fourcade
 Women's 12.5 km Mass Start winner:  Darya Domracheva
 Men's 4 x 7.5 km Relay winners:  (Evgeniy Garanichev, Timofey Lapshin, Dmitry Malyshko, and Anton Shipulin)
 Women's 4 x 6 km Relay winners:  (Eva Puskarčíková, Gabriela Soukalová, Jitka Landová, and Veronika Vítková)
 January 13 – 18: World Cup #5 in  Ruhpolding
 Men's 10 km Sprint winner:  Johannes Thingnes Bø
 Women's 7.5 km Sprint winner:  Fanny Welle-Strand Horn
 Men's 15 km Mass Start winner:  Simon Schempp
 Women's 12.5 km Mass Start winner:  Darya Domracheva
 Men's 4 x 7.5 km Relay winners:  (Ole Einar Bjørndalen, Erlend Bjøntegaard, Johannes Thingnes Bø, and Emil Hegle Svendsen)
 Women's 4 x 6 km Relay winners:  (Eva Puskarčíková, Gabriela Soukalová, Jitka Landová, and Veronika Vítková)
 January 21 – 25: World Cup #6 in  Rasen-Antholz
 Men's 10 km Sprint winner:  Simon Schempp
 Women's 7.5 km Sprint winner:  Darya Domracheva
 Men's 12.5 km Pursuit winner:  Simon Schempp
 Women's 10 km Pursuit winner:  Darya Domracheva
 Men's 4 x 7.5 km Relay winners:  (Ole Einar Bjørndalen, Tarjei Bø, Johannes Thingnes Bø, and Emil Hegle Svendsen)
 Women's 4 x 6 km Relay winners:  (Franziska Hildebrand, Franziska Preuß, Luise Kummer, and Laura Dahlmeier)
 February 5 – 8: World Cup #7 in  Nové Město na Moravě
 Men's 10 km Sprint winner:  Jakov Fak
 Women's 7.5 km Sprint winner:  Laura Dahlmeier
 Men's 12.5 km Pursuit winner:  Jakov Fak
 Women's 10 km Pursuit winner:  Darya Domracheva
 Mixed Single Mixed Relay winners:  (Yana Romanova and Alexey Volkov)
 Mixed 2 x 6 km + 2 x 7.5 km Relay winners:  (Fanny Welle-Strand Horn, Tiril Eckhoff, Johannes Thingnes Bø, and Tarjei Bø)
 February 11 – 15: World Cup #8 in  Oslo-Holmenkollen
 Men's Individual 20 km winner:  Martin Fourcade
 Women's Individual 15 km winner:  Kaisa Mäkäräinen
 Men's 10 km Sprint winner:  Arnd Peiffer
 Women's 7.5 km Sprint winner:  Darya Domracheva
 Men's 4 x 7.5 km Team Relay winners:  (Evgeniy Garanichev, Maxim Tsvetkov, Dmitry Malyshko, and Anton Shipulin)
 Women's 4 x 6 km Team Relay winners:  (Eva Puskarčíková, Gabriela Soukalová, Jitka Landová, and Veronika Vítková)
 March 18 – 22: World Cup Final (#9) in  Khanty-Mansiysk
 Men's 10 km Sprint winner:  Martin Fourcade
 Women's 7.5 km Sprint winner:  Kaisa Mäkäräinen
 Men's 12.5 km Pursuit winner:  Nathan Smith
 Women's 10 km Pursuit winner:  Darya Domracheva
 Men's 15 km Mass Start winner:  Jakov Fak
 Women's 12.5 km Mass Start winner:  Laura Dahlmeier

Winter IBU Cup
 November 28, 2014 – March 7, 2015: 2014–15 Winter IBU Cup
 November 28 – 30, 2014: IBU Cup #1 in  Beitostølen
 Men's 10 km Sprint #1 winner:  Andrejs Rastorgujevs
 Women's 7.5 km Sprint #1 winner:  Weronika Nowakowska-Ziemniak
 Men's 10 km Sprint #2 winner:  Florian Graf
 Women's 7.5 km Sprint #2 winner:  Evgenia Seledtsova
 December 12 – 14, 2014: IBU Cup #2 in  Martell
 Canceled, due to lack of snow at the site.
 December 15 – 20, 2014: IBU Cup #3 in  Obertilliach
 Men's 20 km Individual winner:  Vitaliy Kilchytskyy
 Women's 10 km Individual winner:  Tina Bachmann
 Men's 10 km Sprint #1 winner:  Baptiste Jouty
 Men's 10 km Sprint #2 winner:  Baptiste Jouty
 Women's 7.5 km Sprint #1 winner:  Federica Sanfilippo
 Women's 7.5 km Sprint #2 winner:  Iryna Varvynets
 Mixed 2x6+2x7.5 km Relay winners:  (Thekla Brun-Lie, Hilde Fenne, Vegard Gjermundshaug, Lars Helge Birkeland)
 January 7 – 11: IBU Cup #4 in  Duszniki-Zdrój
 Men's 10 km Sprint #1 winner:  Florian Graf
 Men's 10 km Sprint #2 winner:  Johannes Kuehn
 Women's 7.5 km Sprint #1 winner:  Irina Trusova
 Women's 7.5 km Sprint #2 winner:  Miriam Gössner
 Men's 12.5 km Pursuit winner:  Johannes Kuehn
 Women's 10 km Pursuit winner:  Miriam Gössner
 January 15 – 18: IBU Cup #5 in  Ridnaun-Val Ridanna
 Men's 10 km Sprint winner:  Alexey Slepov
 Women's 7.5 km Sprint winner:  Miriam Gössner
 Men's 12.5 km Pursuit winner:  Lars Helge Birkeland
 Women's 10 km Pursuit winner:  Miriam Gössner
 Mixed 2x6+2x7.5 km Relay winners:  (Annika Knoll, Karolin Horchler, Johannes Kuehn, Christoph Stephan)
 February 6 – 8: IBU Cup #6 in  Brezno–Osrblie
 Men's 10 km Sprint winner:  Lars Helge Birkeland
 Women's 7.5 km Sprint winner:  Galina Nechkasova
 Men's 12.5 km Pursuit winner:  Lars Helge Birkeland
 Women's 10 km Pursuit winner:  Karolin Horchler
 February 27 – March 1: IBU Cup #7 in  Canmore
 Men's 10 km Sprint #1 winner:  Alexey Kornev
 Women's 7.5 km Sprint #1 winner:  Karolin Horchler
 Men's 10 km Sprint #2 winner:  Florian Graf
 Women's 7.5 km Sprint #2 winner:  Karolin Horchler
 March 1 – 7: Final Winter IBU Cup (#8) in  Canmore
 Men's 20 km Individual winner:  Matvey Eliseev
 Women's 15 km Individual winner:  Karolin Horchler
 Men's 10 km Sprint winner:  Christoph Stephan
 Women's 7.5 km Sprint winner:  Anna Nikulina
 Mixed 2x6km+2x7.5 km Relay winners:  (Anaïs Chevalier, Marine Bolliet, Baptiste Jouty, Antonin Guigonnat)

Other biathlon competitions
 January 27 – February 3: Biathlon European Championships 2015 in  Otepää
 Junior:  won both the gold and overall medal tallies.
 Senior:  won both the gold and overall medal tallies.
 February 17 – 24: 2015 IBU Youth/Junior World Championships in  Minsk – Raubichi
** won both the gold and overall medal tallies.
 March 3 – 15: Biathlon World Championships 2015 in  Kontiolahti
 Men's 10 km Sprint winner:  Johannes Thingnes Bø
 Women's 7.5 km Sprint winner:  Marie Dorin Habert
 Men's 12.5 km Pursuit winner:  Erik Lesser
 Women's 10 km Pursuit winner:  Marie Dorin Habert
 Men's 20 km Individual winner:  Martin Fourcade
 Women's 15 km Individual winner:  Ekaterina Yurlova
 Men's 4 x 7.5 km Team Relay winners:  (Erik Lesser, Daniel Böhm, Arnd Peiffer, Simon Schempp)
 Women's 4 x 6 km Team Relay winners:  (Franziska Hildebrand, Franziska Preuß, Vanessa Hinz, Laura Dahlmeier)
 Men's 15 km Mass Start winner:  Jakov Fak
 Women's 12.5 km Mass Start winner:  Valj Semerenko
 Mixed 2 x 6 km + 2 x 7.5 km Team Relay winners:  (Veronika Vítková, Gabriela Soukalová, Michal Šlesingr, Ondřej Moravec)

IPC Biathlon World Cup and World Championships
 December 10, 2014 – March 22, 2015: 2014–15 IPC Biathlon World Cup
 December 10 – 17, 2014: World Cup #1 in  Vuokatti

  won both the gold and overall medal tallies.
 February 4 – 11: World Cup #2 in  PyeongChang
 Cancelled, due to unknown reasons.
 March 16 – 22: World Cup #3 (final) in  Surnadal

  won both the gold and overall medal tallies.
 January 24 – February 1: 2015 IPC Biathlon and Cross-Country Skiing World Championships in  Cable, Wisconsin

  won both the gold and overall medal tallies. (Biathlon portion)

Cross-country skiing
 November 29, 2014 – March 15, 2015: 2014–15 FIS Cross-Country World Cup
 November 29 & 30, 2014: World Cup #1 in  Kuusamo
 Men's Sprint Classical winner:  Eirik Brandsdal
 Women's Sprint Classical winner:  Marit Bjørgen
 Men's 15 km Classical winner:  Iivo Niskanen
 Women's 10 km Classical winner:  Therese Johaug
 December 5 – 7, 2014: World Cup #2 in  Lillehammer (Stage World Cups)
 Men's Sprint Freestyle winner:  Pål Golberg
 Men's 10 km Freestyle winner:  Martin Johnsrud Sundby
 Men's 15 km Classical Pursuit winner:  Martin Johnsrud Sundby
 Women's Sprint Freestyle winner:  Marit Bjørgen
 Women's 5 km Freestyle winner:  Therese Johaug
 Women's 10 km Classical Pursuit winner:  Marit Bjørgen
 December 13 & 14, 2014: World Cup #3 in  Davos
 Men's 15 km Classical winner:  Martin Johnsrud Sundby
 Women's 10 km Classical winner:  Therese Johaug
 Men's Sprint Freestyle winner:  Finn Hågen Krogh
 Women's Sprint Freestyle winner:  Ingvild Flugstad Østberg
 December 20 & 21, 2014: World Cup #4 in  Davos
 Men's 15 km Freestyle winner:  Anders Gløersen
 Women's 10 km Freestyle winner:  Marit Bjørgen
 Men's Sprint Freestyle winner:  Federico Pellegrino
 Women's Sprint Freestyle winner:  Marit Bjørgen
 January 17 & 18: World Cup #5 in  Otepää
 Men's Sprint Classical winner:  Tomas Northug
 Women's Sprint Classical winner:  Ingvild Flugstad Østberg
 Men's Team Sprint Freestyle winners:  (Alexei Petukhov / Sergey Ustiugov)
 Women's Team Sprint Freestyle winners:  (Ida Ingemarsdotter / Stina Nilsson)
 January 23 – 25: World Cup #6 in  Rybinsk
 Men's 15 km Freestyle winner:  Dario Cologna
 Women's 10 km Freestyle winner:  Astrid Uhrenholdt Jacobsen
 Men's Sprint Freestyle winner:  Federico Pellegrino
 Women's Sprint Freestyle winner:  Jennie Oeberg
 Men's Skiathlon winner:  Maxim Vylegzhanin
 Women's Skiathlon winner:  Yuliya Chekaleva
 February 14 & 15: World Cup #7 in  Östersund
 Men's Sprint Classical winner:  Finn Hågen Krogh
 Women's Sprint Classical winner:  Marit Bjørgen
 Men's 15 km Freestyle winner:  Finn Hågen Krogh
 Women's 10 km Freestyle winner:  Charlotte Kalla
 March 7 & 8: World Cup #8 in  Lahti
 Men's Sprint Freestyle winner:  Eirik Brandsdal
 Women's Sprint Freestyle winner:  Marit Bjørgen
 Men's 15 km Classical winner:  Francesco de Fabiani
 Women's 10 km Classical winner:  Marit Bjørgen
 March 11: World Cup #9 in  Drammen
 Men's Sprint Classical winner:  Eirik Brandsdal
 Women's Sprint Classical winner:  Maiken Caspersen Falla
 March 14 & 15: World Cup #10 (final) in  Oslo
 Men's 50 km Freestyle Mass Start winner:  Sjur Røthe
 Women's 30 km Freestyle Mass Start winner:  Marit Bjørgen

Tour de Ski
 January 3 & 4: TdS #1 & TdS #2 in  Oberstdorf
 Men's 4 km Freestyle Prologue winner:  Dario Cologna
 Women's 3 km Freestyle Prologue winner:  Marit Bjørgen
 Men's 15 km Classical Pursuit winner:  Petter Northug
 Women's 10 km Classical Pursuit winner:  Marit Bjørgen
 January 6: TdS #3 in  Val Müstair
 Men's Sprint Freestyle winner:  Federico Pellegrino
 Women's Sprint Freestyle winner:  Marit Bjørgen
 January 7 & 8: TdS #4 & TdS#5 in  Toblach
 Men's 10 km Classical winner:  Alexey Poltoranin
 Women's 5 km Classical winner:  Marit Bjørgen
 Men's 25 km Freestyle Pursuit winner:  Petter Northug
 Women's 15 km Freestyle Pursuit winner:  Marit Bjørgen
 January 10 & 11: TdS #6 & TdS #7 in  Fiemme Valley (final)
 Men's 15 km Classical Mass Start winner:  Tim Tscharnke
 Women's 10 km Classical Mass Start winner:  Therese Johaug
 Men's 9 km Freestyle Pursuit winner:  Martin Johnsrud Sundby
 Women's 9 km Freestyle Pursuit winner:  Marit Bjørgen
 Men's Overall winner:  Martin Johnsrud Sundby
 Women's Overall winner:  Marit Bjørgen

Nordic World Ski Championships (CC)
 February 18 – March 1: FIS Nordic World Ski Championships 2015
 Men's 15 km Freestyle winner:  Johan Olsson
 Women's 10 km Freestyle winner:  Charlotte Kalla
 Men's 30 km Pursuit winner:  Maxim Vylegzhanin
 Women's 15 km Pursuit winner:  Therese Johaug
 Men's Sprint Classical winner:  Petter Northug
 Women's Sprint Classical winner:  Marit Bjørgen
 Men's Team sprint winners:  Finn Hågen Krogh / Petter Northug
 Women's Team sprint winners:  Ingvild Flugstad Østberg / Maiken Caspersen Falla
 Men's 4 x 10 km Team Relay winners:  Niklas Dyrhaug / Didrik Tønseth / Anders Gløersen / Petter Northug
 Women's 4 x 5 km Team Relay winners:  Heidi Weng / Therese Johaug / Astrid Uhrenholdt Jacobsen / Marit Bjørgen
 Men's 50 km Classical Mass Start winner:  Petter Northug
 Women's 30 km Classical Mass Start winner:  Therese Johaug

IPC Cross-Country World Cup
 December 10, 2014 – March 22, 2015: 2014–15 IPC Cross-Country World Cup
 December 10 – 17, 2014: World Cup #1 in  Vuokatti, Sotkamo

  won both the gold and overall medal tallies.
 February 4 – 11: World Cup #2 in  PyeongChang
 Cancelled for unknown reasons.
 February 14 – 18: World Cup #3 in  Asahikawa

 The  won the gold medal tally.  won the overall medal tally.
 March 16 – 22: World Cup #4 (final) in  Surnadal

  won both the gold and overall medal tallies.
 January 24 – February 1: 2015 IPC Biathlon and Cross-Country Skiing World Championships in  Cable, Wisconsin

  won both the gold and overall medal tallies. (Cross-country section)

Freestyle skiing
 December 5, 2014 – March 15, 2015: 2014–15 FIS Freestyle Skiing World Cup

Mogul skiing and Aerials
 December 13, 2014 – March 15, 2015: 2014–15 Moguls and Aerials Schedule
 December 13, 2014: World Cup #1 in  Kuusamo
 Men's Dual Moguls winner:  Philippe Marquis
 Women's Dual Moguls winner:  Yuliya Galysheva
 December 20 & 21, 2014: World Cup #2 in  Beijing
 Men's Aerials #1 winner:  Qi Guangpu
 Men's Aerials #2 winner:  Qi Guangpu
 Women's Aerials #1 winner:  Xu Mengtao
 Women's Aerials #2 winner:  Xu Mengtao
 Team Aerials winners:  1 (Jia Zongyang, Xu Mengtao, Qi Guangpu)
 January 3: World Cup #3 in  Calgary
 Men's Moguls winner:  Mikaël Kingsbury
 Women's Moguls winner:  Hannah Kearney
 January 8 – 10: World Cup #4 in  Deer Valley
 Men's Aerials winner:  Qi Guangpu
 Women's Aerials winner:  Ashley Caldwell
 Men's Moguls winner:  Mikaël Kingsbury
 Women's Moguls winner:  K.C. Oakley
 Men's Dual Moguls winner:  Mikaël Kingsbury
 Women's Dual Moguls winner:  Justine Dufour-Lapointe
 January 29 – 31: World Cup #5 in  Lake Placid, New York
 Men's Aerials winner #1:  Mac Bohonnon
 Women's Aerials winner #1:  Aliaksandra Ramanouskaya
 Men's Aerials winner #2:  Zhou Hang
 Women's Aerials winner #2:  Renee McElduff
 Men's Moguls winner:  Mikaël Kingsbury
 Women's Moguls winner:  Justine Dufour-Lapointe
 February 7: World Cup #6 in  Val Saint-Côme (Montreal)
 Men's Moguls winner:  Mikaël Kingsbury
 Women's Moguls winner:  Hannah Kearney
 February 21: World Cup #7 in  Moscow
 Men's Aerials winner:  Mac Bohonnon
 Women's Aerials winner:  Danielle Scott
 February 28 & March 1: World Cup #8 in  Tazawako (Tazawa Ski Area)
 Men's Moguls winner:  Mikaël Kingsbury
 Women's Moguls winner:  Hannah Kearney
 Men's Dual Moguls winner:  Mikaël Kingsbury
 Women's Dual Moguls winner:  Morgan Schild
 March 1: World Cup #9 in  Minsk
 Men's Aerials winner:  Oleksandr Abramenko
 Women's Aerials winner:  Ashley Caldwell
 March 15: World Cup #10 (final) in  Megève
 Men's Dual Moguls winner:  Anthony Benna
 Women's Dual Moguls winner:  Hannah Kearney

Ski cross
 December 5, 2014 – March 14, 2015: 2014–15 Ski Cross Schedule
 December 5 & 6, 2014: World Cup #1 in  Nakiska (Calgary)
 Men's winner:  Thomas Zangerl
 Women's winner:  Marielle Thompson
 January 8 – 10: World Cup #2 in  Val Thorens
 Men's winner #1:  Andreas Schauer
 Women's winner #1:  Marielle Thompson
 Men's winner: #2:  Marc Bischofberger
 Women's winner #2:  Marielle Thompson
 February 5 – 7: World Cup #3 in  Arosa
 Men's winner #1:  Victor Oehling Norberg
 Women's winner #1:  Fanny Smith
 Men's winner #2:  Victor Oehling Norberg
 Women's winner #2:  Fanny Smith
 February 13 – 15: World Cup #4 in  Åre
 Men's winner #1:  Victor Oehling Norberg
 Women's winner #1:  Alizée Baron
 Men's winner #2:  Jean-Frédéric Chapuis
 Women's winner #2:  Anna Holmlund
 February 20 – 22: World Cup #5 in  Tegernsee
 Men's winner #1:  Jean-Frédéric Chapuis
 Women's winner #1:  Fanny Smith
 Men's winner #2:  Jean-Frédéric Chapuis
 Women's winner #2:  Anna Holmlund
 March 13 & 14: World Cup #6 (final) in  Megève
 Men's winner #1:  Sylvain Miaillier
 Women's winner #1:  Anna Holmlund
 Men's winner #2:  Jean-Frédéric Chapuis
 Women's winner #2:  Anna Holmlund

Half-pipe and Slopestyle
 December 3, 2014 – March 14, 2015: 2014–15 Half-pipe and Slopestyle Schedule
 December 3 & 5, 2014: World Cup #1 in  Copper Mountain (Denver)
 Men's Half-pipe winner:  David Wise
 Women's Half-pipe winner:  Janina Kuzma
 February 25 – 28: World Cup #2 in  Park City, Utah
 Men's Slopestyle winner:  Joss Christensen
 Women's Slopestyle winner:  Emma Dahlström
 Men's Half-pipe winner:  Gus Kenworthy
 Women's Half-pipe winner:  Ayana Onozuka
 March 11 & 12: World Cup #3 in  Tignes
 Men's Half-pipe winner:  Mike Riddle
 Women's Half-pipe winner:  Cassie Sharpe
 March 13 & 14: World Cup #4 (final) in  Silvaplana
 Men's Slopestyle winner:  Felix Stridsberg Usterud
 Women's Slopestyle winner:  Tiril Sjåstad Christiansen

World freestyle ski championships
 January 15 – 25: FIS Freestyle Ski and Snowboarding World Championships 2015 in  Kreischberg
 Note: This championship is paired with the FIS Snowboard World Championships 2015 together.
 Men's Aerials winner:  Qi Guangpu
 Women's Aerials winner:  Laura Peel
 Men's Moguls winner:  Anthony Benna
 Women's Moguls winner:  Justine Dufour-Lapointe
 Men's Dual moguls winner:  Mikaël Kingsbury
 Women's Dual moguls winner:  Hannah Kearney
 Men's Halfpipe:  Kyle Smaine
 Women's Halfpipe:  Virginie Faivre
 Men's Slopestyle:  Fabian Bösch
 Women's Slopestyle:  Lisa Zimmermann
 Men's Ski Cross winner:  Filip Flisar
 Women's Ski Cross winner:  Andrea Limbacher
 March 24 – April 1: Freestyle Skiing FIS Junior World Championships 2015 in  Chiesa in Valmalenco
 Men's Junior Aerials winner:  Harrison Smith
 Women's Junior Aerials winner:  Aliaksandra Ramanouskaya
 Men's Junior Moguls winner:  Aleksey Pavlenko
 Women's Junior Moguls winner:  Perrine Laffont
 Men's Junior Dual Moguls winner:  Aleksey Pavlenko
 Women's  Junior Dual Moguls winner:  Perrine Laffont
 Men's Junior Slopestyle winner:  Luca Schuler
 Women's Junior Slopestyle winner:  Nanaho Kiriyama
 Men's Junior Halfpipe winner:  Beau-James Wells
 Women's Junior Halfpipe winner:  Molly Summerhayes
 Men's Junior Ski Cross winner:  Tyler Wallasch
 Women's Junior Ski Cross winner:  India Sherret

Nordic combined
 November 29, 2014 – March 14, 2015: 2014–15 FIS Nordic Combined World Cup
 November 29 & 30, 2014: World Cup #1 in  Kuusamo
 Individual winner:  Johannes Rydzek
 Team winners:  Håvard Klemetsen & Jørgen Graabak
 December 6 & 7, 2014: World Cup #2 in  Lillehammer
 Individual winner #1:  Eric Frenzel
 Individual winner #2:  Mikko Kokslien
 December 20 & 21, 2014: World Cup #3 in  Ramsau am Dachstein
 Individual winner:  Jason Lamy-Chappuis
 Team winners:  Mikko Kokslien, Håvard Klemetsen, Jan Schmid, and Jørgen Graabak
 January 3 & 4: World Cup #4 in  Schonach im Schwarzwald
 Individual winner:  Lukas Klapfer
 Team winners:  Eric Frenzel, Tino Edelmann, Björn Kircheisen, and Johannes Rydzek
 January 10 & 11: World Cup #5 in  Chaux-Neuve
 Individual winner #1:  Eric Frenzel
 Individual winner #2:  Magnus Moan
 January 16 – 18: World Cup #6 in  Seefeld
 Individual winner #1:  Eric Frenzel
 Individual winner #2:  Eric Frenzel
 Individual winner #3:  Eric Frenzel
 January 23 & 24: World Cup #7 in  Sapporo
 Individual winner #1:  Eric Frenzel
 Individual winner #2:  Eric Frenzel
 January 30 – February 1: World Cup #8 in  Fiemme Valley
 Individual winner #1:  Bernhard Gruber
 Team winners:  Jan Schmid and Joergen Graabak
 Individual winner #2:  Joergen Graabak
 March 6 & 7: World Cup #9 in  Lahti
 Individual winner:  Akito Watabe
 Team winners:  (Fabian Rießle & Johannes Rydzek)
 March 12: World Cup #10 in  Trondheim
 Individual winner:  Magnus Moan
 March 14: World Cup #11 (final) in  Oslo
 Individual winner:  Akito Watabe
 February 20 – 28: FIS Nordic World Ski Championships 2015
 Individual Gundersen Large Hill / 10 km winner:  Bernhard Gruber
 Individual Gundersen Normal Hill / 10 km winner:  Johannes Rydzek
 Team Normal Hill / 4×5 km winners:  Tino Edelmann / Eric Frenzel / Fabian Rießle / Johannes Rydzek
 Team Sprint Large Hill / 2×7.5 km winners:  François Braud / Jason Lamy-Chappuis

Nordic skiing
 January 24 – February 1: 2015 IPC Biathlon and Cross-Country Skiing World Championships in  Cable, Wisconsin
 For cross-country results, click here.
 For biathlon results, click here.
 February 18 – March 1: FIS Nordic World Ski Championships 2015 in  Falun
  won both the gold and overall medal tallies.

Ski jumping
 November 22, 2014 – March 22, 2015: 2014–15 FIS Ski Jumping World Cup

Men
 November 21 – 23, 2014: World Cup #1 in  Klingenthal
 Winner:  Roman Koudelka
 November 27 – 29, 2014: World Cup #2 in  Kuusamo
 Event #1 winner:  Simon Ammann
 Event #2 Co-winners:  Simon Ammann and  Noriaki Kasai
 December 5 – 7, 2014: World Cup #3 in  Lillehammer
 Event #1 winner:  Gregor Schlierenzauer
 Event #2 winner:  Roman Koudelka
 December 12 – 14, 2014: World Cup #3 in  Nizhny Tagil
 Event #1 winner:  Anders Fannemel
 Event #2 winner:  Severin Freund
 December 19 – 21, 2014: World Cup #4 in  Engelberg
 Event #1 winner:  Richard Freitag
 Event #2 winner:  Roman Koudelka
 January 9 & 10: World Cup #5 in  Tauplitz/Bad Mitterndorf
 Winner:  Severin Freund
 January 15: World Cup #6 in  Wisła
 Winner:  Stefan Kraft
 January 16 – 18: World Cup #7 in  Zakopane
 Winner:  Kamil Stoch
 January 23 – 25: World Cup #8 in  Sapporo
 Event #1 winner:  Peter Prevc
 Event #2 winner:  Roman Koudelka
 January 30 – February 1: World Cup #9 in  Willingen
 Event #1 winner:  Kamil Stoch
 Event #2 winner:  Severin Freund
 February 7 & 8: World Cup #10 in  Titisee-Neustadt
 Event #1 winner:  Severin Freund
 Event #2 winner:  Anders Fannemel
 February 13 – 15: World Cup #11 in  Vikersund
 Event #1 winner:  Peter Prevc
 Event #2 winner:  Severin Freund
 March 6 – 8: World Cup #12 in  Lahti
 Winner:  Stefan Kraft
 March 10: World Cup #13 in  Kuopio
 Winner:  Severin Freund
 March 12: World Cup #14 in  Trondheim
 Winner:  Severin Freund
 March 13 – 15: World Cup #15 in  Oslo
 Event #1 winner:  Severin Freund
 Event #2 winner:  Severin Freund
 March 19 – 22: World Cup #16 (final) in  Planica
 Event #1 winner:  Peter Prevc
 Event #2 winner:  Jurij Tepeš

Women
 December 5, 2014: World Cup #1 in  Lillehammer
 Winner:  Špela Rogelj
 January 10 & 11: World Cup #2 in  Sapporo
 Winner #1:  Sara Takanashi
 Winner #2:  Sara Takanashi
 January 18: World Cup #3 in  Zaō, Miyagi
 Winner:  Carina Vogt
 January 24 & 25: World Cup #4 in  Oberstdorf
 Winner #1:  Daniela Iraschko-Stolz
 Winner #2:  Daniela Iraschko-Stolz
 January 31 & February 1: World Cup #5 in  Hinzenbach
 Winner #1:  Daniela Iraschko-Stolz
 Winner #2:  Carina Vogt
 February 7 & 8: World Cup #6 in  Râșnov
 Winner #1:  Daniela Iraschko-Stolz
 Winner #2:  Sara Takanashi
 February 14 & 15: World Cup #7 in  Ljubno ob Savinji
 Winner #1:  Sara Takanashi
 Winner #2:  Daniela Iraschko-Stolz
 March 13: World Cup #8 (final) in  Oslo
 Winner:  Sara Takanashi

Team (men only)
 November 22, 2014: Team World Cup #1 in  Klingenthal
 Winners:  (Markus Eisenbichler, Richard Freitag, Andreas Wellinger, and Severin Freund)
 January 17: Team World Cup #2 in  Zakopane
 Winners:  (Michael Neumayer, Marinus Kraus, Richard Freitag, and Severin Freund)
 January 31: Team World Cup #3 in  Willingen
 Winners:  (Jurij Tepeš, Nejc Dežman, Jernej Damjan, and Peter Prevc)
 March 7: Team World Cup #4 in  Lahti
 Winners:  (Anders Bardal, Anders Jacobsen, Anders Fannemel, Rune Velta)
 March 21: Team World Cup #5 (final) in  Planica
 Winners:  (Jurij Tepeš, Anže Semenič, Robert Kranjec, Peter Prevc)

Four Hills Tournament
 December 27 – 29, 2014: FHT #1 in  Oberstdorf
 Winner:  Stefan Kraft
 December 31, 2014 – January 1, 2015: FHT #2 in  Garmisch-Partenkirchen
 Winner:  Anders Jacobsen
 January 3 & 4: FHT #3 in  Innsbruck
 Winner:  Richard Freitag
 January 5 & 6: FHT #4 (final) in  Bischofshofen
 Winner:  Michael Hayböck
 Overall winner:  Stefan Kraft

Nordic World Ski Championships (SJ)
 February 19 – 28: FIS Nordic World Ski Championships 2015
 Men's Individual Normal Hill winner:  Rune Velta
 Men's Individual Large Hill winner:  Severin Freund
 Men's Team Large Hill winners:  Anders Bardal / Anders Jacobsen / Anders Fannemel / Rune Velta
 Women's Individual Normal Hill winner:  Carina Vogt
 Mixed Team Normal Hill winners:  Carina Vogt / Richard Freitag / Katharina Althaus / Severin Freund

Snowboarding
 December 4, 2014 – March 21, 2015: 2014–15 FIS Snowboard World Cup

Freestyle snowboarding
 December 4, 2014 – March 14, 2015: 2014–15 Freestyle Snowboarding Schedule
 December 4 – 6, 2014: World Cup #1 in  Copper Mountain
 Men's Half-pipe winner:  Taylor Gold
 Women's Half-pipe winner:  Kelly Clark
 December 20, 2014: World Cup #2 in  Istanbul
 Men's Big Air winner:  Seppe Smits
 Women's  Big Air winner:  Ty Walker
 February 18 – 21: World Cup #3 in  Stoneham-et-Tewkesbury (Stoneham Mountain Resort)
 Men's Big Air winner:  Darcy Sharpe
 Women's Big Air winner:  Cheryl Maas
 Men's Slopestyle winner:  Michael Ciccarelli
 Women's Slopestyle winner:  Cheryl Maas
 February 25 – March 1: World Cup #4 in  Park City, Utah
 Men's Slopestyle winner:  Eric Willett
 Women's Slopestyle winner:  Cheryl Maas
 Men's Half-pipe winner:  Zhang Yiwei
 Women's Half-pipe winner:  Kelly Clark
 March 13 & 14: World Cup #5 (final) in  Špindlerův Mlýn
 Men's Slopestyle winner:  Lucien Koch
 Women's Slopestyle winner:  Cheryl Maas

Snowboard Cross
 March 13 – 21: 2014–15 Snowboard Cross Schedule
 March 13 – 15: World Cup #1 in  Veysonnaz
 Men's winner #1:  Lucas Eguibar
 Women's winner #1:  Michela Moioli
 Men's winner #2:  Alex Pullin
 Women's winner #2:  Dominique Maltais
 March 20 & 21: World Cup #2 (final) in  La Molina
 Men's winner:  Chris Robanske
 Women's winner:  Charlotte Bankes

Alpine snowboarding
 December 16, 2014 – March 14, 2015: 2014–15 Alpine Snowboarding Schedule
 December 16, 2014: World Cup #1 in  Carezza
 Men's Parallel Giant Slalom winner:  Roland Fischnaller
 Women's Parallel Giant Slalom winner:  Marion Kreiner
 December 18 & 19: World Cup #2 in  Montafon
 Men's Parallel Slalom winner:  Roland Fischnaller
 Women's Parallel Slalom winner:  Sabine Schoeffmann
 January 9 & 10: World Cup #3 in  Bad Gastein
 Men's Parallel Slalom winner:  Žan Košir
 Women's Parallel Slalom winner:  Ester Ledecká
 Mixed Parallel Slalom Team winners:  Svetlana Boldykova / Valery Kolegov
 January 31: World Cup #4 in  Rogla
 Men's Parallel Giant Slalom winner:  Vic Wild
 Women's Parallel Giant Slalom winner:  Marion Kreiner
 February 6 & 7: World Cup #5 in  Sudelfeld
 Men's Parallel Giant Slalom winner:  Andrey Sobolev
 Women's Parallel Giant Slalom winner:  Ester Ledecká
 February 28 & March 1: World Cup #6 in  Asahikawa, Hokkaido
 Men's Parallel Giant Slalom winner:  Žan Košir
 Women's Parallel Giant Slalom winner:  Julia Dujmovits
 Men's Parallel Slalom winner:  Žan Košir
 Women's Parallel Slalom winner:  Julie Zogg
 March 7: World Cup #7 in  Moscow
 Men's Parallel Slalom winner:  Justin Reiter
 Women's Parallel Slalom winner:  Claudia Riegler
 March 14: World Cup #8 (final) in  Winterberg
 Men's Parallel Slalom winner:  Roland Fischnaller
 Women's Parallel Slalom winner:  Hilde-Katrine Engeli

World snowboarding championships
 January 15 – 25: FIS Freestyle Ski and Snowboarding World Championships 2015 in  Kreischberg
 Note: This championship is paired with the FIS Freestyle World Ski Championships 2015 together.
 Men's Big Air winner:  Roope Tonteri
 Women's Big Air winner:  Elena Könz
 Men's Half-pipe winner:  Scott James
 Women's Half-pipe winner:  Cai Xuetong
 Men's Snowboard cross winner:  Luca Matteotti
 Women's Snowboard cross winner:  Lindsay Jacobellis
 Men's Slopestyle winner:  Ryan Stassel
 Women's Slopestyle winner:  Miyabi Onitsuka
 Men's Parallel slalom winner:  Roland Fischnaller
 Women's Parallel slalom winner:  Ester Ledecká
 Men's Parallel Giant slalom winner:  Andrey Sobolev
 Women's Parallel Giant slalom winner:  Claudia Riegler
 February 23 – 28: 2015 IPC Para-Snowboard World Championships	in  La Molina (Barcelona)
 For results, click here.
 March 9 – 15: Snowboarding FIS Junior World Championships 2015 in  Yabuli
 Men's Junior Parallel Giant Slalom winner:  Lee Sang-ho
 Women's Junior Parallel Giant Slalom winner:  Natalia Soboleva
 Men's Junior Slopestyle winner:  Erik Bastiaansen
 Women's Junior Slopestyle winner:  Nora Healey
 Men's Junior Parallel Slalom winner:  Vladislav Shkurikhin
 Women's Junior Parallel Slalom winner:  Natalia Soboleva
 Men's Junior Half-pipe winner:  Kweon Lee-jun 
 Women's Junior Half-pipe winner:  Madison Taylor Barrett
 Men's Junior Snowboard Cross winner:  Daniil Dilman
 Women's Junior Snowboard Cross winner:  Charlotte Bankes
 Men's Junior Team Snowboard Cross winners:  Matthew Thomas / Adam Lambert
 Women's Junior Team Snowboard Cross winners:  Juliette Lefevre / Charlotte Bankes

References

External links
 International Ski Federation official website
 IPC Alpine Skiing official website
 International Biathlon Union official website
 IPC Biathlon and Cross Country Skiing official website

Skiing by year
Skiing
Skiing